In molecular biology, the OmpA domain is a conserved protein domain with a beta/alpha/beta/alpha-beta(2) structure found in the C-terminal region of many Gram-negative bacterial outer membrane proteins, such as porin-like integral membrane proteins (such as ompA), small lipid-anchored proteins (such as pal), and MotB proton channels. The N-terminal half of these proteins is variable although some of the proteins in this group have the OmpA-like transmembrane domain at the N terminus. OmpA from Escherichia coli is required for pathogenesis, and can interact with host receptor molecules. MotB (and MotA) serve two functions in E. coli, the MotA(4)-MotB(2) complex attaches to the cell wall via MotB to form the stator of the flagellar motor, and the MotA-MotB complex couples the flow of ions across the cell membrane to movement of the rotor.

See also 

 OmpA-like transmembrane domain

References

Protein families
Outer membrane proteins